Natasha Loring is a South African actress. She first gained prominence through her roles in the films The Dinosaur Project (2012) and Zulu (2013), and the E4 comedy-drama Beaver Falls (2011–2012). She won a SAFTA for her performance in the Showmax thriller Dam (2021–).

Early life
Loring grew up in the Beaulieu area of Midrand. Her father is theatre producer Richard Loring. She attended St Stithians College. She studied at AFDA, The School for the Creative Economy, graduating with a Bachelor of Arts, and then the Actors Centre London (now Seven Dials Playhouse). She also trained in ballet and modern dance.

Career
During her first year at AFDA, Loring landed her first professional role as Julie Saunders in the film Hitchhiker, in which she appeared with her sister Samantha. 'Hitchhiker premiered during Loring's final year at AFDA. This was followed by her television debut as Hayley in the Lifetime film Natalee Holloway.

Loring began appearing in British media, beginning with small roles in the BBC two-parter Women in Love and the Sky One crime drama The Runaway, and then starring as Kimberley in the E4 comedy-drama Beaver Falls from 2011 to 2012 and Liz Draper in the science fiction film The Dinosaur Project. She played Marjorie in the 2013 French-South African film Zulu.

Loring has lent her voice to video games such as League of Legends (2009), Game of Thrones: A Telltale Games Series (2014), and Tacoma (2017), as well as a number of Star Wars and Call of Duty games. She appeared in the films Broken Star and The Wedding Year in 2018 and 2019 respectively, and made guest appearances in the Netflix series Queen Sono and the Syfy series Vagrant Queen in 2020.

In 2021, Loring began starring as Sienna Fischer alongside Lea Vivier in the Showmax thriller Dam. For the first season, Loring won Best Supporting Actress in a Television Drama at the South African Film and Television Awards. She produced the short film A Shame.

Filmography

Film

Television

Video games

References

External links
 
 Natasha Loring at Artistes Personal Management (APM)

Living people
1987 births
21st-century South African actresses
Actresses from Johannesburg
Alumni of St Stithians College
South African voice actresses